A Farewell to Arms is a 1966 British television adaptation of Ernest Hemingway's 1929 novel A Farewell to Arms that aired on three consecutive weeks (15 February, 22 February – 1 March 1966). The work starred Vanessa Redgrave, George Hamilton, Susan Engel, Ann Rye and Erik Chitty and was directed by Rex Tucker.

Despite receiving critical praise and an enthusiastic response from audiences, all three episodes were later wiped and are believed to be lost.

Cast
Vanessa Redgrave as Catherine Barkley
George Hamilton as Lt. Frederick Henry
Susan Engel

Reception
The Observer said Redgrave gave a "brilliant performance".

References

External links
 
Episodes at IMDb.com

1966 television films
1966 films
1966 drama films
British romantic drama films
1960s British television miniseries
Films based on American novels
Films based on works by Ernest Hemingway
Television shows based on American novels
1960s English-language films
1960s British films
British drama television films